Nils Kristian Paulsen (1935–2017) was an international speedway rider from Norway.

Speedway career 
Paulsen won two silver medals (1958 and 1964) and two bronze medals (1954 and 1963) at the Norwegian Individual Speedway Championship.

He rode in the British Speedway leagues from 1965 to 1966.

References 

1935 births
2017 deaths
Norwegian speedway riders
Glasgow Tigers riders
Leicester Hunters riders
Exeter Falcons riders